The International Terrestrial Reference System (ITRS) describes procedures for creating reference frames suitable for use with measurements on or near the Earth's surface. This is done in much the same way that a physical standard might be described as a set of procedures for creating a realization of that standard. The ITRS defines a geocentric system of coordinates using the SI system of measurement.

An International Terrestrial Reference Frame (ITRF) is a realization of the ITRS. Its origin is at the center of mass of the whole earth including the oceans and atmosphere. New ITRF solutions are produced every few years, using the latest mathematical and surveying techniques to attempt to realize the ITRS as precisely as possible. Due to experimental error, any given ITRF will differ very slightly from any other realization of the ITRF. The difference between the latest as of 2006 WGS 84 (frame realisation G1150) and the latest ITRF2000 is only a few centimeters and RMS difference of one centimeter per component.

The ITRS and ITRF solutions are maintained by the International Earth Rotation and Reference Systems Service (IERS). Practical navigation systems are in general referenced to a specific ITRF solution, or to their own coordinate systems which are then referenced to an ITRF solution. For example, the Galileo Terrestrial Reference Frame (GTRF) is used for the Galileo navigation system; currently defined as ITRF2005 by the European Space Agency.

Versions 

The ITRF realizations developed from the ITRS since 1991 include the following versions:

Users 
GNSS systems:
 Galileo Terrestrial Reference Frame (GTRF), ITRF2005; own implementation using IGS sites.
 GPS WGS 84 of 2013, ITRF2008; International GNSS Service (IGS) implementation.
 BeiDou Coordinate System, China Terrestrial Reference Frame (CTRF) 2000 = ITRF97 at epoch 2000.0; own implementation.
 GLONASS PZ-90.11 is nominally its own system, but is quite close to ITRF and uses many of the same techniques.

National systems:
 United States: WGS 84 (see above); domestic use is mainly based on NAD 83 instead.
 China: CTRF 2000 per above.

The GPS reference epoch was moved from 2000.0 to 2001.0 in G1150 due to an Alaskan earthquake in November 2002. Still in 2022 ITRF2020 was released, yet GPS is only using G2139 in its antennas, which was aligned to ITRF2014 (IGb14) (though at epoch 2016.0, not reference epoch 2010.0). On 27 November 2022 move to IGS20 is planned, so WGS 84 will be aligned with ITRF2020, including PSD (post-seismic deformation), soon to be G2238.

On the other hand GLONASS is using PZ-90.11, which is close to ITRF2008 at epoch 2011.0 and is using 2010.0 epoch (that means when you use reference transformation to PZ-90.11 you will get January 2010 date).

See also 
 Earth-centered, Earth-fixed coordinate system
 Earth orientation parameters
 Geodetic datum
 International Celestial Reference System and its realizations
 Terrestrial reference frame
 World Geodetic System

References

External links 
 Forward and backward transformations using 14 parameters Helmert
 Convertor between ITRF realisations with changing the epoch and tectonics, tectonics for it
 What is ITRF?
 Terrestrial reference systems and frames (PDF; chapter 4 of IERS Conventions 2010)

Geodetic datums